Đuro Kurepa (Serbian Cyrillic: Ђуро Курепа, ; 16 August 1907 – 2 November 1993) was a Yugoslav mathematician, university professor and academic.

Throughout his life, Kurepa published over 700 articles, books, papers, and reviews and over 1,000 scientific reviews. He lectured at universities across Europe, as well as those in Canada, Cuba, Iraq, Israel, and the United States, and was quoted saying "I lectured at almost each of [the] nineteen universities of [the former] Yugoslavia..."

Early life
Born as Đurađ Kurepa in Majske Poljane, Kingdom of Croatia-Slavonia, Austria-Hungary to a Serb family. In English, his name was transliterated as Djuro Kurepa while in French he is often attributed as Georges Kurepa. Kurepa was the youngest of Rade and Anđelija Kurepa's fourteen children. His nephew was the mathematician Svetozar Kurepa.

He began his schooling in Majske Poljane, continued his education in Glina, and graduated from high school in Križevci. He received a diploma in theoretical mathematics and physics from the University of Zagreb in 1931, and began work as an assistant in the teaching of mathematics the same year. Kurepa then went to the Collège de France and the University of Paris, where he received his doctoral diploma in 1935; his advisor was French mathematician Maurice René Fréchet, and his thesis was titled Ensembles ordonnés et ramifiés.

Career
Kurepa continued to receive post-doctoral education at Warsaw University in Poland and the University of Paris. He became an assistant professor at the University of Zagreb in 1937, associate professor the next year, and assumed the position of full professor in 1948. After the end of World War II and the formation of the Socialist Federal Republic of Yugoslavia, he traveled to five universities in the United States: Harvard University in Cambridge, Massachusetts, the University of Chicago in Chicago, Illinois, the branch of the University of California at Berkeley and the branch at Los Angeles, California the Institute for Advanced Study in Princeton, New Jersey and Columbia University in New York City, New York.

Kurepa was ICM Plenary Speaker in 1954 and 1958.

In 1965, Kurepa shifted to the University of Belgrade, where he focused on the fields of logic and set theory mathematics. Kurepa was a member of several organizations, including the Serbian Academy of Sciences and Arts and the Yugoslav Academy of Sciences and Arts He was also the founder and president of the Society of Mathematicians and Physicists of Croatia, the founder and chief editor of the journal Mathematica Balkanica, and the president of the Yugoslav National Committee for Mathematics, the Balkan Mathematical Society, and the Union of Yugoslav Societies of Mathematicians, Physicisists and Astronomers. He received the AVNOJ Award in 1976, and retired from the University of Belgrade in 1977.

He  published his scientific works in the most notable European and world scientific journals, including: Matematische Annalen, Izvestiya Akademii nauk SSSR, Fundamenta Mathematicae, Acta Mathematica, Comptes Rendus de l'Académie des sciences, Bulletin de la Société Mathématique de France, Zeitschrift für mathematische Logik und Grundlagen der Mathematik, Journal of Symbolic Logic, Pacific Journal of Mathematics.

Death and legacy
On 1 November 1993, Kurepa was robbed and beaten after retrieving his pension from a bank. He was then hidden from view under a set of stairs. He succumbed to his injuries on 2 November 1993 in a Belgrade emergency ward. He is interred in the Alley of Distinguished Citizens in the Belgrade New Cemetery.

As a mathematician, he is known especially for his works on set theory and general topology.

Kurepa influenced set theory mathematics in several ways, including lending his name to the Kurepa tree. According to Kajetan Šeper, Kurepa's colleague from the University of Zagreb:
Professor Kurepa was not only the professional mathematician and teacher, but he was a scientist, philosopher, and humanist as well, in the true sense of these words. He was the founder and pioneer in mathematical logic and the foundations of mathematics in Croatia, and modern mathematical theories in Croatia and Yugoslavia. Generally speaking, he was the catalyzer, the initiator, and the bearer of mathematical science.

According to the Mathematics Genealogy Project, Kurepa supervised 27 students, including set theorist Stevo Todorčević and topologist Ljubisa D.R. Kocinac.

Awards 

 AVNOJ award, 1976
 Bernard Bolzano Charter, Prague, 1981
 Order of Labour, 1965
 Order of Merits for the People with a golden star, 1979

Selected works 

 Books

 Teorija skupova, Belgrade, 1951
 ŠTO SU SKUPOVI I KAKVA IM JE ULOGA, Zagreb, 1960
 Viša algebra - knjiga prva, Belgrade, 1969
 Viša algebra - knjiga druga, Belgrade, 1969
 Selected Papers of Đuro Kurepa, Belgrade, 1996-12

 Scientific works

 
 SUR LES ENSEMBLES ORDONNES DENOMBRABLES, Zagreb, 1948
 O REALNIM FUNKCIJAMA U OBITELjI SKUPOVA RACIONALNIH BROJEVA, Zagreb, 1953
 On universal ramified sets, Zagreb, 1963
 Monotone mappings between some kinds of ordered sets, Zagreb, 1964
 Publikovani naučni radovi Đura Kurepe 1961 - 1976, Belgrade, 2012

References

External links 

  (thesis in Paris)
 Biography of Kurepa 
 Dimitrić, Radoslav. Academician, Professor Ðuro Kurepa (1907--1993). The Review of Modern Logic 1994. 4:401-403

1907 births
1993 deaths
1993 murders in Serbia
People from Glina, Croatia
Serbs of Croatia
Set theorists
Serbian mathematicians
University of Warsaw alumni
University of Paris alumni
Faculty of Science, University of Zagreb alumni
Academic staff of the University of Zagreb
Academic staff of the University of Belgrade
Members of the Serbian Academy of Sciences and Arts
Yugoslav mathematicians
People murdered in Serbia
Serbian murder victims
Deaths by beating in Europe
Unsolved murders in Serbia
Burials at Belgrade New Cemetery